The Neubrügg or Neubrücke is a covered wooden bridge over the river Aare between the village of Kirchlindach and Bern in the canton of Bern in Switzerland. It is a Swiss heritage site of national significance.

History
The bridge was first built in 1469 to replace a ferry crossing over the Aare. The bridge eventually became part of two major roads that helped Bern control its extensive territory north of the river. The road into the Berner Seeland passed over the bridge before traveling to Meikirch, while the other road ran into the Fraubrunnenamt after passing through Oberlindach and Münchenbuchsee. The Neubrügg remained important until motorized traffic made it obsolete. It was supplanted by the concrete Halenbrücke in 1911-13.

See also
List of Aare bridges in Bern

References

External links

 History of Kirchlindach 

Bridges in Bern
Old City (Bern)
Bridges completed in 1469
Bridges over the Aare
Cultural property of national significance in the canton of Bern
Pedestrian bridges in Switzerland
Covered bridges in Switzerland